Whipsaw  is a 1935 American crime drama film directed by Sam Wood and starring Myrna Loy and Spencer Tracy. Written by Howard Emmett Rogers, based on a story by James Edward Grant, the film is about a government agent working undercover traveling across the country with an unsuspecting woman, hoping she will lead him to her gang of jewel thieves. The film was produced by Harry Rapf for Metro-Goldwyn-Mayer, and was released on December 18, 1935, in the United States.

Plot
Thieves Ed Dexter and Harry Ames are trying to steal some valuable pearls. When Ed discovers another gang, led by "Doc" Evans, has the same idea, he tips off the police to get rid of the competition. Then Ed and Harry get what they were after. When the authorities connect Vivian to the robbery (she had worked with Ed and Harry in the past, but not on this theft), government agent Ross McBride is assigned to get Vivian to lead him to her partners by pretending to be a crook named Danny Ackerman. However, Vivian quickly realizes Ross is a plant. Nonetheless, she plays along, as the other bunch of crooks is following her. Meanwhile, Ed has hidden the pearls in the handle of Vivian's hand mirror without her knowledge.

On their travels, Ross and Vivian stop at a farmhouse, where they help the distraught Dabsons with the birth of twins. Ross and Vivian gradually fall in love with each other. When he overhears her phoning Ed to tell him she is quitting her life of crime, he is at a loss what to do, "whipsawed" as he calls it. He confesses to her that he is government agent; she reveals that she already knows. He then embraces her, but drops the mirror he was holding, revealing the pearls. He does not believe her protestations of innocence.

Evans and his gang find Ed and Harry and force the story out of them at gunpoint. Then Evans, his associate Steve and Ed go to pick up the loot. Hearing the ruckus, Ross manages to toss the pearls out the window just before they break into the bedroom where he and Vivian are staying (pretending to be a newly married couple, but sleeping in separate beds). Vivian tells them that she found the pearls, and her "husband" claims he hid them in St. Louis. They set out for the city; Ross manages to take along his gun undetected. Ross suggests they stop at a roadside cafe for breakfast, then sends Vivian to the ladies' room. With her out of danger, he pulls out his gun, and they all start shooting. Vivian warns him as Ed sneaks to the side and is just about to get a clear shot at him. The two men shoot each other. State troopers passing by gain control of the situation.

Afterward, Ross exonerates Vivian from his hospital bed by having her answer questions "yes" or "no", nothing else, in the presence of his boss and a stenographer. Once that is done, she grills him in turn, making him admit he loves her. He has one more question for her, but she already knows what it is and answers "yes".

Cast
 Myrna Loy as Vivian Palmer
 Spencer Tracy as Ross McBride / [Danny Ross Ackerman]
 Harvey Stephens as Ed Dexter
 William Harrigan as "Doc" Evans
 Clay Clement as Harry Ames
 Robert Gleckler as Steve Arnold
 Robert Warwick as Robert W. Wadsworth
 Georges Renavent as Monetta
 Paul Stanton as Chief Hughes
 Wade Boteler as Humphries
 Don Rowan as Curley
 John Qualen as [Will] Dabson
 Irene Franklin as Mme. Marie
 Lillian Leighton as Aunt Jane
 J. Anthony Hughes as Bailey
 William Ingersoll as Dr. Williams
 Charles Irwin as Larry King

Production

Development
Initially the film was designed for the duo William Powell and Myrna Loy. Spencer Tracy was called due to unavailability of the actor.

Originally, the title of this movie was Unexpected Bride.

Shooting dates were October 22 to November 20, 1935.

In one scene, Myrna Loy appears without makeup, her hair unkempt. MGM executive E.J. Mannix chastised photographer 'Howe, James Wong' for doing so, as MGM had spent millions glamorizing Loy. Finally the scene was cut.

It was noted that Myrna Loy and Spencer Tracy had an affair during the shooting, in the greatest secrecy. It was the first film of the two actors together. In her autobiography, Myrna Loy stated that Spencer Tracy, who had fallen in love with her, had harassed her during the filming. Rumors are that they had been romantically linked to the end of the filming, to resume a year later in Libeled Lady. Loy and Tracy would hide their affair.

Reception
Frank Nugent, critic for The New York Times, described the film as "at once an effective melodrama and a pleasant love story." Though he found the premise not particularly original, he wrote that "Sam Wood has directed it at a brisk pace and with a rare knack of making the expected happen in the most unexpected way. Myrna Loy and Spencer Tracy demonstrate again that they are among the screen's most interesting players, and they are assisted most capably by the rest of the cast."

According to MGM records, the film earned $574,000 in the US and Canada and $391,000 elsewhere resulting in a profit of $404,000.

References

External links
 
 
 
 

1935 films
American black-and-white films
American crime drama films
American romantic drama films
Films produced by Harry Rapf
Metro-Goldwyn-Mayer films
1935 crime drama films
1935 romantic drama films
Films set in London
1930s English-language films
1930s American films